Polk Township is one of ten townships in Marshall County, Indiana, United States. As of the 2010 census, its population was 2,824 and it contained 1,183 housing units.

History
Polk Township was organized on March 4, 1845. The date of the township's organization coincided with the inauguration of James K. Polk, hence the name.

The Polk Township District No. 2 School was listed on the National Register of Historic Places in 2013.

Geography

Unincorporated towns
 Koontz Lake (east edge)
 Teegarden at 
 Tyner at

Cemeteries
The township contains Barber Cemetery Blissville Cemetery and Tyner Cemetery.

Major highways

Airports and landing strips
 Stuntz and Hochstetler Pines Airport

School districts
 John Glenn School Corporation

Political districts
 Indiana's 2nd congressional district
 State House District 17
 State Senate District 5

References
 
 United States Census Bureau 2008 TIGER/Line Shapefiles
 IndianaMap

External links
 Indiana Township Association
 United Township Association of Indiana
 City-Data.com page for Polk Township

Townships in Marshall County, Indiana
Townships in Indiana